Chopper was an alleged ghost living in a dentist's office in the city of Neutraubling near Regensburg in Germany that was later discovered by the criminal police to be a fraud.

History
In the summer of 1981, Chopper started appearing in phone calls made by the dentist. He spewed insults with a distorted voice and only appeared to be nice to the then 16-year-old dental assistant Claudia. At some point, the dentist called the police to find the source of the supposed person terrorizing him during phone calls. The German Bundespost replaced the entire telephone wiring and installed technical traps to find the source of the voices. The police checked the vicinity for possible illegal radio broadcasts.

Later, the voices started to come from sinks, toilets, and sockets in the dentist's office as well. Despite spending DM 60,000 to uncover the source of the voices, neither the police nor the Bundespost were successful in finding the source. As such, the police handed responsibility over to the criminal police who founded the special unit "Soko Geist". The criminal police hoped to solve the case quickly, but by then the story of the ghost spread all over the world; journalists from the USA, Japan, and even New Zealand appeared to let Claudia showcase the ghost. Several newspapers offered exclusive contracts to Claudia, the magazine Stern offered her DM 120,000. Even parapsychologists came to visit the dentist's office and speculate about the nature of Chopper.

The criminal police searched 55 neighboring apartments, made ultravoice measurements in the sewers and even high-frequency physicists built up their measurement devices. However, they all could only record the voice, but not discover its source.

Discovery of the fraud
The policemen noticed how Claudia always turned her back towards the people when Chopper spoke. On March 3, 1982, they noticed Claudia's lips moving in accordance with Chopper's words in the mirror. Claudia, the dentist and his wife were brought to the police station and admitted that they made everything up. The two used the special acoustics of the tiled room and some voice training to create the voices. In a press release the next day, the criminal police showcased how Chopper never existed and how the voices can easily be recreated.

The judge determined the motive to be Claudia's need to be admired. She was fined DM 1500, while the dentist and his wife were fined a five-digit amount of money and had to pay DM 35,000 to the German Bundespost as damage compensation. The dentist and his wife couldn't stand the pressure after the court decision and voluntarily admitted themselves to a psychiatric hospital. Claudia was fired, completely retreated from the public and assumed a new identity.

References

German ghosts